Words of Japanese origin have entered many languages. Some words are simple transliterations of Japanese language words for concepts inherent to Japanese culture, but some are actually words of Chinese origin that were first exposed to English via Japan. The words on this page are an incomplete list of words which are listed in major English dictionaries and whose etymologies include Japanese. The reverse of this list can be found at List of gairaigo and wasei-eigo terms.

Arts 
 anime  アニメ , hand-drawn and computer animation originating from or associated with Japan. 
 bokeh  (from ぼけ boke), subjective aesthetic quality of out-of-focus areas of an image projected by a camera lens.
 bonsai  盆栽 , "tray gardening"; the art of tending miniature trees. Originated from Chinese 盆栽 penzai
 bunraku 文楽, a form of traditional Japanese puppet theatre, performed by puppeteers, chanters, and shamisen players.
 haiku  俳句 , a very short poem consisting of three lines of 5, 7, and 5 morae (not syllables as commonly thought) each; see also tanka below.
 ikebana  生花, flower arrangement.
 imari 伊万里, Japanese porcelain wares (made in the town of Arita and exported from the port of Imari, particularly around the 17th century).
 kabuki 歌舞伎, a traditional form of Japanese theatre; also any form of elaborate theatre, especially metaphorically.
 kaiju 怪獣, Japanese genre of horror and science fiction films featuring giant monsters.
 kakemono 掛け物, a vertical Japanese scroll, of ink-and-brush painting or calligraphy, that hangs in a recess on a wall inside a room.
 kakiemon 柿右衛門, Japanese porcelain wares featuring enamel decoration (made in Arita, using the style developed in the 17th century by 酒井田 柿右衛門 Sakaida Kakiemon).
 karaoke  カラオケ , (English IPA) "empty orchestra";  entertainment where an amateur singer accompanies recorded music.
 kirigami  切り紙, similar to origami, but involves cutting in addition to folding.
 koto 琴, a traditional stringed musical instrument from Japan, resembling a zither with 13 strings.
 makimono 巻物, a horizontal Japanese hand scroll, of ink-and-brush painting or calligraphy
 manga  まんが or 漫画 , (English IPA) Japanese comics; refers to comics in general in Japanese
netsuke 根付, a toggle used to tie the sash of a kimono also to attach small items such as inro and kinchaku: sometimes beautifully carved.
 noh 能 nō, a major form of classical Japanese music drama
 origami  折り紙, artistic paper folding. (British English IPA)
 otaku  オタク or おたく or ヲタク, a geeky enthusiast, especially of anime and manga.
 senryu  川柳, a form of short poetry similar to haiku.
 shamisen 三味線, a three-stringed musical instrument, played with a plectrum.
 sumi-e  墨絵, a general term for painting with a brush and black ink.
 tanka  短歌, "short poetry"; an older form of Japanese poetry than haiku, of the form 5-7-5-7-7 morae (not syllables; see also haiku above).
tankōbon 単行本, "independent/standalone book"; term for a book that is complete in itself and is not part of a series or corpus. In modern Japan, though, it is most often used in reference to individual volumes of a single manga, as opposed to magazines.
ukiyo-e 浮世絵, a type of woodblock print art or painting. (English IPA)
waka 和歌, "Japanese poetry"; a word used primarily to describe tanka (see above) written between the 9th and 19th centuries.
wabi-sabi 侘び寂び, a world view or aesthetic centered on the acceptance of transience and imperfection.

Business 
 kaizen 改善, literally "change for the better." In practice, a Japanese business philosophy of continuous improvement of working practices, personal efficiency, etc. Initially made famous by the 1986 book of same name.
 kanban 看板, literally a "signal" or "sign" signals a cycle of replenishment for production and materials and maintains an orderly and efficient flow of materials throughout the entire manufacturing process.
 karoshi  過労死, "death by overwork, stress death"
 keiretsu  系列, a set of companies with interlocking business relationships and shareholdings.
 Poka-yoke   "mistake-proofing" or "inadvertent error prevention".
 tycoon  大君 ("taikun"), "great prince" or "high commander", later applied to wealthy business leaders. 
 zaibatsu  財閥, a "money clique" or conglomerate

Clothing 
 geta 下駄, a pair of Japanese raised wooden clogs worn with traditional Japanese garments, such as the kimono
 inro 印籠 inrō, a case for holding small objects, often worn hanging from the obi; (traditional Japanese clothes didn't have pockets)
 kimono 着物, a traditional full-length robe-like garment still worn by women, men and children. (English IPA)
 obi 帯, a wide belt that is tied in the back to secure a kimono
 yukata 浴衣, a casual or simplified summer style of kimono
 zori 草履 zōri, sandals made from rice straw or lacquered wood, worn with a kimono for formal occasions

Culinary 
 adzuki, azuki bean あずき or 小豆 , type of bean grown in eastern Asia and the Himalayas, used in Chinese, Korean, and Japanese cuisines, usually served sweet
 arame  荒布, a type of edible seaweed
 bento  弁当 bentō, a single-portion takeout meal, box lunch
 daikon  大根, a kind of white radish
 dashi  だし or 出汁, a simple soup stock considered fundamental to Japanese cooking
 edamame  枝豆, soybeans boiled whole in the green pod and served with salt
 enokitake, enoki mushroom  えのきたけ or 榎茸, long, thin white mushrooms, used in Japanese, Korean and Chinese cuisines
 fugu  河豚 or フグ, the meat of the toxic pufferfish, must be prepared by specially trained chefs by law. Also means pufferfish itself.
 ginkgo  銀杏 or ぎんなん ginnan, a gymnospermous tree (Ginkgo biloba) of eastern China that is widely grown as an ornamental or shade tree and has fan-shaped leaves and yellow fruit (the word is derived from 17th Century Japanese 銀杏 ginkyō)
 gyoza  ギョーザ or 餃子 gyōza, Japanese name for Chinese dumplings, jiaozi (jiǎozi); may also be called pot stickers in English if they are fried
 hibachi  火鉢, a small, portable charcoal grill; used in North America to refer to a teppan or a small shichirin-like aluminium or cast iron grill
 hijiki  ひじき or 鹿尾菜, a type of edible seaweed commonly found on rocky coastlines

katsu カツ, Japanese term for cutlets in general; in English, typically refers to the dish chicken katsu, a type of breaded chicken cutlet served with rice and sauce. (English IPA)
katsuo 鰹, a skipjack tuna
katsuobushi かつおぶし or 鰹節, dried and smoked skipjack tuna (katsuo), which is shaved and then used in dashi
koji 麴 or 麹 kōji, a fungus that is the active agent in the fermentation processes, of producing miso and soy sauce from soybeans, and of producing sake and shōchū from rice.
kombu 昆布, dried kelp, which can be eaten or used as dashi
matsutake 松茸, a type of edible mushroom, with a magnificently spicy aroma similar to cinnamon, considered to be a great delicacy and the most coveted mushroom in Japan
mirin 味醂, an essential condiment of the Japanese cuisine, a kind of rice wine similar to sake with a slightly sweet taste
miso 味噌, a thick paste made by fermenting soybeans with salt
mizuna 水菜, an edible plant, with flavor akin to the mustard plant
mochi餅, sticky rice cake
napa cabbage 菜っ葉, Chinese cabbage, (in Japan, it is a generic term for leaf vegetables.)
nashi (pear) 梨, a species of pear native to eastern Asia, which are juicy, round and shaped like apples. Often simply referred to as "asian pear(s)".
natto 納豆, traditional Japanese food made from fermented soybeans
nori 海苔, food products created from the seaweed laver by a shredding and rack-drying process that resembles papermaking.
panko パン粉, Japanese white bread flakes. Panko is made from bread without crusts, thus it has a crisper, airier texture than most types of breading found in Western cuisine.
ramen ラーメン rāmen, the Japanese version of Chinese noodle soup, not limited to the instant variety. (British English IPA)
sake 酒 ,nihon-shu(日本酒), an alcoholic beverage, brewed from rice. In Japanese, the word commonly refers to alcoholic drinks in general
sashimi 刺身, a Japanese delicacy primarily consisting of the freshest raw seafoods thinly sliced and served with only a dipping sauce and wasabi.
satsuma (from 薩摩 Satsuma, an ancient province of Japan), a type of mandarin orange (mikan) native to Japan
shabu shabu しゃぶしゃぶ, a meal where each person cooks their own food in their own cooking pot from an assortment of raw ingredients
shiitake mushroom しいたけ or 椎茸 , an edible mushroom typically cultivated on the shii tree
shoyu 醬油 or 醤油shōyu, Japanese soy sauce
soba 蕎麦 or ソバ, thin brown buckwheat noodles
soy from shoyu 醤油
sukiyaki すき焼き or スキヤキ, a dish in the nabemono-style (one-pot), consisting of thinly sliced beef, tofu, konnyaku noodles, negi, Chinese cabbage (bok choy), and enoki mushrooms among others
surimi すり身 or 擂り身, processed meat made from cheaper white-fleshed fish, to imitate the look of a more expensive meat such as crab legs
sushi 鮨 or 鮓 or 寿司, a dish consisting of vinegared rice combined with other ingredients such as raw fish, raw or cooked shellfish, or vegetables
takoyakiたこ焼, たこ焼き, or 章魚焼き, literally fried or baked octopus
tamari 溜まり or たまり, liquid obtained by pressing soybeans
tempura てんぷら or 天麩羅, classic Japanese deep fried batter-dipped seafood and vegetables. The word may be from Portuguese tempêro/seasoning.
teppanyaki 鉄板焼き, a type of Japanese cuisine that uses a hot iron griddle (teppan) to cook food
teriyaki 照り焼き or テリヤキ, a cooking technique where fish or meat is being broiled/grilled in a sweet soy sauce marinade; in Japanese, it is used exclusively refer to poultry cooked in this manner.
tofu 豆腐 tōfu  bean curd. Although the word is originally Chinese, it entered English via Japanese.
udo ウド or 独活, an edible plant found on the slopes of wooded embankments, also known as the Japanese Spikenard
udon うどん or 饂飩, a type of thick wheat-based noodle
umami 旨味 or うま味,  the taste sensation produced by some condiments such as monosodium glutamate; a basic flavor in sea weed (昆布 kombu)
umeboshi 梅干, pickled ume
wakame ワカメ or 若布, a type of edible kelp, often used in miso soup (Japan), and salads
wasabi わさび or 山葵, a strongly flavoured green condiment also known as Japanese horseradish
yakitori 焼き鳥 or 焼鳥, a type of chicken kebab.

Government and politics 
 daimyō 大名 daimyō, "great names"; the most powerful Japanese feudal rulers from the 12th century to the 19th century
 genro 元老 genrō, retired elder Japanese statesmen, who served as informal advisors to the emperor, during the Meiji and Taisho eras
 mikado 帝, a dated term for "emperor"; specifically for the Emperor of Japan
 shogun 将軍 shōgun , the title of the practical ruler of Japan for most of the time from 1192 to the Meiji Era
 tenno 天皇, a term for the Emperor of Japan

Martial arts 

 aikido 合気道 aikidō
 dojo 道場 dōjō
 judo 柔道 jūdō, refers to the Olympic sport.
 jujutsu 柔術 jūjutsu, alternately spelt, through mutation, as jiu-jitsu in English.
 karate 空手 a fighting style which includes the use of hands and feet to strike the opponent, without any weapon, and is also a popular international sports event. Literally means "empty handed".
 kendo 剣道 kendō
 sumo 相撲 sumō

Religion 
 bonze (from 凡僧 bonsō), a Buddhist monk
 koan 公案 kōan, a paradoxical story or statement used during meditation in Zen Buddhism. Inspired the hacker koan tradition among computing circles.
 satori 悟り, enlightenment in Zen Buddhism
 shinto 神道 shintō, the native religion of Japan
 torii 鳥居, traditional Japanese gates commonly found at the gateway to Shinto shrines
 zen  禅, from Chinese 禪 (Mandarin Chán), originally from ध्यान Sanskrit Dhyāna / Pali झान Jhāna, a branch of Mahāyāna Buddhism.

Other 

ahegao
アヘ顔, a facial expression in pornographic animation and manga usually depicted when someone is having an orgasm
akita 
秋田 (from 秋田犬, akitainu or akitaken), the Akita Inu, a large breed of Japanese dog
baka
(馬鹿, ばか in hiragana, or バカ in katakana) means "fool", "silly", "stupid", or "foolish" and is the most frequently used pejorative term in the Japanese language.
bukkake ぶっかけ, a sex act portrayed in pornographic films, in which several men ejaculate on a woman, or another man. Note that in Japanese it has a broader meaning of "to pour" or "to splash".
domoic acid (from ドウモイ doumoi in the Tokunoshima dialect of Japanese: a type of red algae)
emoji 絵文字,  ideograms used in electronic messages and webpages.
futon (from 布団, a flat mattress with a fabric exterior stuffed with cotton, wool, or synthetic batting that makes up a Japanese bed.)
gaijin 外人, lit. outsider/alien is a Japanese word for foreigners and non-Japanese. The word is typically used to refer to foreigners of non-Asian ethnicities.
geisha 芸者, traditional Japanese artist-entertainers
hentai 変態 , Western usage: pornographic Anime, usually either Japanese in origin or drawn in a Japanese style; Japanese usage: metamorphosis, transformation, abnormality, or perversion
hikikomori ひきこもり or 引き籠もり, a psychological condition where the affected individual lives an extremely socially isolated lifestyle, a decision of preference not by default, (compare NEET)

 honcho 班長 hanchō, head, chief
 kamikaze 神風, the literal meaning is "divine wind"; used to refer to a Japanese soldier in World War II who crashed an airplane into a target, committing suicide; also refers to the airplane used in the suicide crash
 katana  (from かたな literally sword) A Japanese sword that has been forged using traditional Japanese methods. This is referred to as 日本刀 (nihontō) in Japanese.
 katsura (tree)  桂, large deciduous trees, native to eastern Asia
 kawaii  可愛い, cute and/or lovely. (English IPA ː )
 koi  鯉, Western usage: ornamental varieties of the common carp (but in Japan this just means "carp" – the ornamental variety are called "nishikigoi" 錦鯉)
 kudzu  (from 葛 or クズ kuzu) A climbing vine found as an invasive species in the south-eastern US, which is native to Japan and south-eastern China
 moxa  もぐさ or 艾 mogusa, mugwort or cotton wool or other combustible material, burned on skin during moxibustion
 moxibustion  (from moxa + (com)bustion), an oriental medicine therapy which involves the burning of moxa (see above)
 ninja  Japanese covert agent of the feudal era
 rickshaw  (from 人力車 jinrikisha/ninryokusha), a human-pulled wagon
 sayonara  左様なら or さようなら sayōnara the Japanese term for "goodbye"
 samurai  侍 or 士, Japanese knight
 sensei  先生, the Japanese term for "master", "teacher" or "doctor". It can be used to refer to any authority figure, such as a schoolteacher, professor, priest, or politician.
 senpai  先輩, the Japanese term for "upperclassman" or "senior".
 shiatsu  指圧, a form of massage
 shiba inu  柴犬, the smallest of the six original and distinct Japanese breeds of dog
 shinro しんろ, a logic puzzle related to sudoku
 skosh A small amount, from 少し or すこし sukoshi, meaning "a bit" or "a few"
 sudoku   数独 sūdoku , a number placement puzzle, also known as Number Place in the United States.
 tanuki  狸, the Japanese name for the animal, Nyctereutes procyonoides, known as a Japanese raccoon dog in English
 tsunami  津波, literally "harbor wave"; Large wave caused by earthquakes or other underwater disturbances. (English IPA ː )
 tsuresari 連れ去り, abducting or kidnapping a child by the parent while defying the rights of the other parent.
 urushiol  (from 漆 or うるし urushi, a plant that gives a skin rash on contact) a chemical substance found in poison-ivy, used to make lacquer-ware

References

See also 

 Glossary of anime and manga
 Japanese words of English origin
 Cuisine of Japan
 :Category:Japanese food preparation utensils
Etiquette in Japan
Japanese honorifics
Aizuchi
Japanese pronouns

English
Japanese